Claude Ruey (born 29 November 1949) is a Swiss politician. He was a member of the National Council from 1999 to 2011.  From 2002 to 2008, he was the president of the Liberal Party of Switzerland. During his presidency, the Liberal Party moved towards its merger with the Free Democratic Party to form FDP.The Liberals.

Biography
Ruey was born in Nyon and grew up in the municipality of Gland in the Canton of Vaud. He studied political science and law at the University of Lausanne. In 1973, at the age of 24, he was elected to the municipal council of Nyon.  In 1974, he joined the Grand Council of Vaud. where he served until 1990. In 1990, he became a member of the Council of State of Vaud. He was elected to the National Council in the 1999 Swiss federal election. He was a member of the Foreign Policy Committee during his first term.

In 2002, Jacques-Simon Eggly stepped down as the president of the Liberal Party.  Ruey ran for the presidency unopposed and was elected to the post in June 2008.  He took over a party that had lost seats in prior elections and lost its seat on the Federal Council.

In the 2003 elections the Liberals ran on a joint slate with the Free Democratic Party after losing a number of seats in prior elections.  Following the election, losses by both parties pushed Ruey and FDP President Christiane Langenberger to pursue closer cooperation between the two parties. Ruey pushed to continue the cooperation of the parties and they formed a common parliamentary group in 2005.  As late as January 2007, Ruey avoided pushing for a formal merger; however, the loss of additional seats in the 2007 Swiss federal election led Ruey to propose a formal merger.

In 2008, Ruey resigned as the party leader in order to become the president of EPER/HEKS, the aid society of the Swiss Protestant church.  He was succeeded by Pierre Weiss in April 2008. In 2011, he stood down from parliament.

In addition to his political career, he has served as the president of the foundation of Chillon Castle and president of the Visions du Réel film festival.

References

External links
Official Parliament Biography

1949 births
Living people
Liberal Party of Switzerland politicians
FDP.The Liberals politicians
Members of the National Council (Switzerland)
People from Nyon